The Savola Group is a Saudi Arabian industrial company. The group's major holdings supply Saudi Arabia, the Middle East and North Africa, and Turkey with edible oils, sugar, fresh dairy products, and restaurants serving fast foods. The group also owns the largest grocery retailing chain in the Middle East, Panda Retail Company.

It is ranked as number 9 among top 100 companies in the Saudi Arabian market and ranked as number 2 among the industrial sector after SABIC. Savola has recently listed its Oils and Fats division in the Saudi Stock market under the name Afia International.

It was founded in 1979 as Saudi Vegetable Oils and Ghee Co., initially the company's business was importing and refining edible oil.

Savola is the kingdom's biggest food company by revenue.

According to Al-Waleed bin Talal, "This group was established by me and some of my allies...I'd created what you could call the 'Nestlé of the Middle East' – the Savola Group, which is a very dominant force in its field."

Acquisitions

In 2009, Savola signed a deal with Alhokair Group to buy Giant supermarket outlets in Saudi Arabia.

In October 2011, Savola bought 78% of Egypt’s Al-Malika and Al-Farasha companies.

In 2018, Savola acquired 51 percent stake of Dubai-based Al Kabeer Group.

In 2022, Savola acquired Egybelg.

References

External Links
Savola Group

Food and drink companies of Saudi Arabia
Saudi Arabian brands
Companies based in Jeddah